The Bydgoszcz City Council is a unicameral governing body of the city of Bydgoszcz, the capital of Kuyavian-Pomeranian Voivodeship. It consists of thirty-one councillors elected in free elections for a five-year term. The current chairperson of the council is Monika Matowska.

After elections in 2018 in Bydgoszcz was formed a centre-left coalition between liberal and pro-market Civic Coalition and social democratic Democratic Left Alliance. Conservative Law and Justice remained in opposition.

City Council Members (2018-23)

election: 21 October 2018
First meeting: 19 November 2018
Chairperson: Monika Matowska (KO)
Wice-Chairpersons:
 Ireneusz Nitkiewicz (SLD)
 Lech Zagłoba-Zygler (KO)
Szymon Wiłnicki (KO)

See also 
 List of presidents of Bydgoszcz
 City Council
 Bydgoszcz

External links

References 

 
City councils in Poland
Politics of Kuyavian-Pomeranian Voivodeship
Bydgoszcz